Delmy Liliana Payés Vásquez (born 21 April 1995), known as Liliana Payés, is a Salvadoran footballer who plays as a forward for Alianza FC. She has been a member of El Salvador women's national team.

Early life
Payés was born in Coatepeque.

Club career
Payés has played for Santa Tecla FC, Legends FC and Alianza in El Salvador. She scored 14 goals for the latter during the 2019 Apertura.

International career
Payés capped for El Salvador at senior level during the 2017 Central American Games.

International goals
Scores and results list El Salvador's goal tally first.

See also
List of El Salvador women's international footballers

References

1995 births
Living people
People from Santa Ana Department
Salvadoran women's footballers
Women's association football forwards
Santa Tecla F.C. footballers
Alianza F.C. footballers
El Salvador women's international footballers